Amor de otoño (English language:Love of Autumn) is a 1996 Argentine romantic drama film directed and written by José Conrado Castelli. Starring Ricardo Alanis.

Cast
Héctor Gióvine
Maria Marchi
Ricardo Alanis  ....  Castro Rendón
Alejandro Duncan
Celia Camus
Néstor Franco
Gustavo Balbuena

External links
 

1996 films
1960s Spanish-language films
1996 romantic drama films
Argentine romantic drama films
1990s Argentine films